Anguilla competed at the 1998 Commonwealth Games in Kuala Lumpur, Malaysia from September 11 to 21 September, 1998.  It was Anguilla's 1st appearance at the Commonwealth Games.

Competitors
The following is the list of number of competitors participating at the Games per sport/discipline.

Athletics

Track & road events

References

Nations at the 1998 Commonwealth Games
Anguilla at the Commonwealth Games